The 2020 Harvey Norman NSW Women's Premiership will be the sixteenth season of the NSW Women's Premiership, the top tier women's rugby league competition administered by the New South Wales Rugby League. The competition acts as a second-tier league to the NRL Women's Premiership teams.

Teams 
In 2020, due to an initial COVID-19 postponement, an adjusted competition will take place. 7 clubs will field teams in the NSW Women's Premiership.

  Canterbury-Bankstown Bulldogs
  Central Coast Roosters

 Cronulla-Sutherland Sharks
 North Sydney Bears
 South Sydney Rabbitohs
 Wentworthville Magpies
 Wests Tigers

Ladder 
Source:

Results

Round 1 
Source:

Round 2

Round 3

Round 4

Round 5 

*The NSWRL abandoned this match with 26 minutes remaining due to a player sustaining a serious injury. The match was deemed a draw.

Round 6

Round 7

Finals Series

Grand Final

See also

Rugby League Competitions in Australia

References

External links

Women's rugby league competitions in Australia
2020 NRL season
2020 in women's rugby league
2020 in Australian women's sport